2571 may refer to:
2571 Geisei, an inner Solar System asteroid
2571, the National Center for Biotechnology Information code for the human gene for glutamate decarboxylase 1
2571, a plot device in Ghost in the Shell (2017 film)
HiTEC® 2571, a rust inhibitor from Afton Chemical
2571, the year in the 26th century

See also
2571 BC